Las Juanas may refer to:
 Las Juanas (Colombian TV series), 1997
 Las Juanas (Mexican TV series), 2004